Yoritsune Matsudaira (born 23 December 1940) is a Japanese equestrian. He competed in two events at the 1964 Summer Olympics.

References

1940 births
Living people
Japanese male equestrians
Japanese dressage riders
Olympic equestrians of Japan
Equestrians at the 1964 Summer Olympics
Place of birth missing (living people)